Oussama Tebbi (born September 23, 1991) is an Algerian footballer who plays for AS Aïn M'lila in the Algerian Ligue Professionnelle 1.

MC Alger 
In July 2019, he signed a contract with ES Setif on a free transfer.

References

External links

Living people
1991 births
Algerian footballers
RC Relizane players
MC Alger players
ES Sétif players
Association football forwards
21st-century Algerian people